The Wasatch Front 100 Mile Endurance Run (Wasatch) is a 100 mile ultramarathon held annually on the first Friday after Labor Day in the Wasatch Front mountain range of Utah. The slogan of the Wasatch Run is "One Hundred Miles of Heaven and Hell", and it is known for its challenging terrain.

History
Wasatch began in 1980 under the leadership of Richard Barnum-Reece as the Wasatch Front 100 and was Utah's first official hundred mile race. The five local runners who were inspired by the Western States, the first of modern-day western 100s.  The following year seven runners competed but no one finished. There were more than 300 entrants in 2019 and the race now operates on a lottery system.

Course records
Geoff Roes holds the men's course record with a finish time of 18:30:55 in 2009. Bethany Lewis holds the women's course record with a time of 22:21:47, which she set in 2014.

References

External links

Ultramarathons in the United States
Sports competitions in Utah